Senator Kearney may refer to:

Belle Kearney (1863–1939), Mississippi State Senate
Eric Kearney (born 1963), Ohio State Senate
Tim Kearney (politician) (born 1960), Pennsylvania State Senate